Porcellio zarcoi is a species of woodlouse in the Porcellionidae family that is endemic to Madeira.

References

Porcellionidae
Crustaceans described in 1960
Endemic fauna of Madeira
Woodlice of Europe